Typhoon Oliwa was one of a record eleven super typhoons in the 1997 Pacific typhoon season. It formed in the central Pacific Ocean on September 2 to the southwest of Hawaii, but it became a typhoon in the western Pacific. Oliwa explosively intensified on September 8, increasing its winds from 85 mph to 160 mph (140 to 260 km/h) in a 24‑hour period. There, it affected 30,000 people and killed 12; thousands of houses were flooded, and some were destroyed. Offshore South Korea, the winds and waves wrecked 28 boats, while one boat went missing with a crew of 10 people. Oliwa dissipated on September 19 in northern Pacific Ocean near the International Date Line.

Meteorological history

The origins of Typhoon Oliwa were from an unusually eastward extension of the monsoon trough in late August 1997. The tropical disturbance organized southwest of Hawaii, and slowly organized. The depression quickly attained tropical storm status, and the CPHC gave it the name "Oliwa", meaning "Oliver" in the Hawaiian language.

A moderately powerful ridge persisted north of Tropical Storm Oliwa, which caused a slow west to west-northwest track. Water temperatures were slightly warmer than usual, and there was a favorable upper-level environment for strengthening. Initially, however, Oliwa was somewhat disorganized on satellite imagery, and on September 4, as it crossed the International Date Line, there may have been multiple circulations. Upon entering the western Pacific Ocean, the Joint Typhoon Warning Center (JTWC) and the Japan Meteorological Agency (JMA) began issuing advisories on the system (9719). Despite the favorable conditions, further intensification was slow, and it reached typhoon status - winds of at least  - on September 8. Prior to that time, Oliwa co-existed with a weak tropical cyclone that formed in a similar location in the south Pacific.

About twelve hours after reaching typhoon status, Oliwa began to undergo unexpected rapid intensification. In a 24‑hour period from 1800 UTC on September 8 to 1800 UTC on September 9, the JTWC assessed the typhoon as nearly doubling in intensity, from  1-min winds, while the pressure dropped 69 mbar to a minimum of 898 mbar; based on the estimated intensity, the JTWC classified Oliwa as a super typhoon. The JMA, which is the official agency of the western Pacific, assessed Oliwa as reaching a peak of  10-min winds), with a pressure of 915 mbar. Around that time, satellite imagery indicated a possible eyewall mesovorticy, which is a small scale rotational feature found in the eyewall of an intense tropical cyclone. Additionally, concentric eyewalls developed in the center of Oliwa, which typically occur in strong typhoons.

After maintaining peak intensity for 36 hours, Oliwa gradually weakened as it continued to the west-northwest, during which it passed through the Northern Marianas Islands. On September 14, the typhoon slowed to the north of Okinawa, and it turned to the northeast toward Japan. As a weakened typhoon, Oliwa moved ashore on Makurazaki, Kagoshima, Kyushu with winds of  late on September 15. It weakened to tropical storm strength while crossing Japan, and deteriorated further to tropical depression status on September 16. On September 17, the JTWC issued the final advisory on Oliwa while it was in the eastern portion of the Sea of Japan. The JMA maintained advisories as the storm crossed northern Japan, and it accelerated over the open Pacific Ocean. On September 19, Oliwa dissipated near the International Date Line to the south of the Aleutian Islands.

Impact and records
The winds downed two coconut trees onto a radio antenna, which left the island temporarily without contact to the outside world. On the Japanese island of Kyushu, where Oliwa made landfall as a weakened typhoon, thousands of homes were flooded, and dozens were destroyed. Its slow movement caused heavy rainfall that created a mudslide in Tashiro, Kagoshima, killing three people. Across Kagoshima Prefecture, officials issued evacuations due to flooding, although many did not heed the warnings. In the prefecture, the typhoon destroyed 131 buildings and damaged about 1,700 more. Damage there was estimated at 14 million yen (1997 JPY, $150,000 in 1997 USD). Across Japan, Oliwa caused 12 fatalities and displaced a total of 30,000 people. Total damage amounted to 4.36 billion yen (US$50.1 million). Offshore the South Korea coast, the winds and strong waves wrecked 28 vessels, and 10 people were reported missing from one ship.

Typhoon Oliwa was one of eleven super typhoons in the western Pacific, which is tied to the previous record of eleven; a typical typhoon season has four super typhoons. The period of heightened activity was the result of one of the most powerful El Niño events on record. The track Oliwa was unusual, due to its origin as a cyclone from the central Pacific Ocean and its path over the Northern Marianas Islands and Japan. The typhoon was one of only two during the season to undergo explosive deepening, which is a decrease in barometric pressure of ≥2.5 mbar per hour for a period of at least 12 hours. In 24 hours, the pressure dropped 69 mbar, which averages 2.9 mbar per hour; such values are usually estimated in the western Pacific using the Dvorak technique.

The name was not retired, although due to the low activity in the central Pacific Ocean, the name will not be used for at least a couple of decades.

See also

 Typhoon Paka (1997)
 Hurricane Ioke (2006)
 Typhoon Halola (2015)

References

External links

JMA General Information of Typhoon Oliwa (9719) from Digital Typhoon
JMA Best Track Data (Graphics) of Typhoon Oliwa (9719)
JMA Best Track Data (Text)
02C.OLIWA from the U.S. Naval Research Laboratory

Typhoons
1997 Pacific hurricane season
1997 Pacific typhoon season
Typhoons in Japan